Cameron Whitten (born April 8, 1991) is an American community activist best known for advocacy on affordable housing, racial justice, and LGBT rights.

Early life and education
Whitten grew up in Sterling, Virginia, outside Washington, D.C. He moved to Portland, Oregon in 2009 and experienced homelessness at the age of eighteen. He later enrolled at Portland Community College.

Political activism
A Portland resident for three years, Whitten, 20, joined the Occupy Portland movement from the start, on October 6. He camped in Lownsdale and Chapman squares for the 38 days of the occupation.

Whitten was arrested four times. He helped plan the Jamison Square occupation in October, and was arrested when police cleared it out. He was arrested during some occupiers' last stand in Chapman Square. And then he was arrested during a theatrical occupation of tiny Mill Ends Park downtown. He also has another arrest in January 2012 for actions during an Occupy the Courts rally.

Whitten got his start in politics as a candidate for mayor of Portland, Oregon, in 2012. He campaigned on a platform of diversity and inclusion. Although among the favorites in The Oregonian "most intriguing political figure" poll, Whitten was not elected mayor.  He was subsequently nominated by the Oregon Progressive Party for the position of state treasurer.

Further community involvement
Also in 2012, Whitten embarked on a hunger strike on the steps of City Hall to protest the housing crisis in Portland, and to demand immediate action from city leaders. The strike lasted almost two months, eliciting a statement from housing commissioner Nick Fish, and ended after concessions were made by the Portland Mayor's Office. Whitten continued to speak publicly about homelessness.

In 2013, Whitten was in the news again when he participated in the campaign for the legalization of same-sex marriage in Oregon.  Also in 2013, Whitten protested the banning of community members who set up 24/7 vigil for the homeless, and their replacement with a fast food cart.  The cart was then removed and the furniture put in storage.

In 2014 Whitten was executive director of the organization Know Your City.  In this role he conducted history-related walking tours of Portland.  That year several of his articles about excessive use of force by police were published in local magazines and news outlets.  He served on Portland's Transit Equity Advisory Committee. Also in 2014 Whitten joined cyclists to protest the dangerous state of Portland city infrastructure after a cyclist was killed while riding in a bike lane.

In 2015, by then a student at Portland State University, Whitten was in the news again when he was arrested after complaining about conditions on a Portland streetcar.  In 2016, representing Know Your City,  he spoke at a Portland City Council meeting about the importance of culturally relevant education.

In 2017, Whitten took part in protests against Donald Trump's executive order banning travelers from specific countries to the US.  During one protest he filmed a violent incident and his footage was used in news reports.  Whitten was later interviewed about the ban by Fox News; interviewer Tucker Carlson questioned Whitten's knowledge of the text of the order.

In 2018, Whitten founded a racial justice nonprofit named Brown Hope. Later that May, he launched Brown Hope's first event, called Reparations Happy Hour, which garnered significant attention in international news outlets. Whitten was later interviewed about the event by Fox News; interviewer Tucker Carlson questioned Whitten about whether the event was offensive.

LGBT rights activism
In July 2018, Whitten became the Interim Executive Director of Q Center, a community center serving Portland's LGBTQ+ community, and was hired to help with an unexpected leadership transition. Shortly after, he accepted a Light a Fire award from Portland Monthly Magazine on behalf of the organization for its years of advocacy for Portland's LGBTQ+ community. In February 2019, Whitten led the organization of an emergency LGBTQ2SIA+ town hall after a series of reports of physical attacks against LGBT individuals in Portland. In June 2019, Whitten launched a capital campaign that raised of $100,000 to renovate Q Center.

2020 Metro Council campaign
On January 21, 2020, Whitten announced his campaign for Metro Council, with endorsements from US Representative Elizabeth Furse and several Portland city councilors. He resigned his position with Q Center in order to focus full-time on the campaign.

Personal life
Whitten identifies as queer.

On December 8, 2022, Whitten was placed on paid leave pending an internal investigation of what the president of Whitten’s non-profit Brown Hope called “multiple serious allegations.”

See also
 List of LGBT people from Portland, Oregon

References

External links 

 

1991 births
Living people
Activists from Portland, Oregon
African Americans in Oregon
LGBT people from Oregon
LGBT people from Virginia
People from Sterling, Virginia
Portland Community College alumni
Queer men
African-American history of Oregon
21st-century American LGBT people